"National Express" is a song by Northern Irish band the Divine Comedy. On 25 January 1999, it was released as the third single from their sixth album, Fin de Siècle (1998), and reached number eight on the UK Singles Chart and number 18 in Ireland. The song is based on Neil Hannon's observations of life from the window of a National Express coach.

Though some listeners have taken the lyrics of "National Express" to be an advertisement for the eponymous British coach company, Neil Hannon has denied that they are. Musically, the song is mainly notated in the key of G major, with its verse containing an alternation of chording from D6 to C major7.

Music video
The official video for the song, directed by Matthew Kirkby, examines with some irony the UK National Health Service from the viewpoint of a mental health patient (portrayed by Hannon) in a psychiatric hospital filmed at the now demolished Joyce Green Hospital in Dartford, Kent. The video begins with a doctor and a woman (the patient's wife), with faces hidden and only their hands shown, talking about the patient's problems. As the music starts, it then cuts to Hannon as the patient, being pushed in a wheelchair by a porter to the wards and then taking his medication; the patient gets out of his hospital bed and starts dancing around. The porter is not pleased by this and immediately returns the patient back to the wheelchair and takes him for electroconvulsive therapy.

On the way the patient starts to behave erratically and the porter unsuccessfully tries to control him, until they finally reach the E.C.T. unit, where the patient is given treatment behind closed doors. The video ends with the patient shown unconscious from his treatment and the porter pushing him back to the ward in the wheelchair. The patient eventually starts to wake up, with two shots of his feet dancing, before the final shot of the patient smiling fades to a long stretch of open road.

Reception
The music press took aim at Hannon for "sneering" at the working classes on the track. Steven Wells of NME wrote: "What a filthy, disgusting, revolting, nauseating little record ... This is mock-pop. This is the work of an 'artist' who thinks himself superior to his art form and despises his audience." Hannon responded: National Express' ... is pure observation, nothing made up – I'm on this bus, this is what I see. 'The family man/manhandling the pram/with paternal pride' is me having a dig at my brother for having a kid and being Nineties Man, you know, and he's not exactly working class."

In a retrospective AllMusic review, critic Tim DiGravina said that the song has a "baroque, grandiose styling" and "might not be a fan favorite, but it helps to solidify Neil Hannon's status as a musical renaissance man."

Appearances
"National Express" is used as the soundtrack for Scottish trials cyclist Danny MacAskill's 2016 short film Wee Day Out.

Track listing
All tracks written by Neil Hannon, except where indicated.

CD1 (SETCDA069)
 "National Express" (radio edit)
 "Going Downhill Fast"
 "Radioactivity" (Ralf Hütter, Florian Schneider, Emil Schult) (Kraftwerk cover version)

CD2 (SETCDB069)
 "National Express" (full album version)
 "Famous" (Stephen Merritt) (The Magnetic Fields cover version)
 "Overstrand"

Cassette (SETMC069)
 "National Express" (full album version)
 "The Heart of Rock and Roll"

Charts

Certifications

References

External links
 Take the National Express - article about the song's importance to National Express Coach's brand recognition
 

1999 singles
1999 songs
The Divine Comedy (band) songs
Setanta Records singles
Songs about buses
Songs about transport
Songs written by Neil Hannon